KDBL (92.9 FM) is a radio station broadcasting a country music format. Licensed to Toppenish, Washington, United States, the station serves the Yakima area. The station is currently owned by Townsquare Media.

History
The station went on the air as KZHR on 1984-08-10, originally on 92.7 with a country format. On 1988-12-01, the station changed its call sign to KHYT. On 1993-12-20, 92.9 changed their callsign again to KXXS with a country format, and a branding change to 'Kicks 93'. On September 8, 1997 switched to KQSN with the slogan "Sunny 92.9" and a switch to adult contemporary. On 2002-03-11, KQSN changed calls to the current KDBL and their country format.

References

External links
Official website
Flash stream
MP3 stream

DBL
Townsquare Media radio stations